"I Need a Man" is a 1975 single by Grace Jones.

Background
"I Need a Man" was the debut single for Grace Jones, originally recorded and released in France for the label Orfeus while Jones was still working as a fashion model. It is a disco and funk song. Its initial release passed fairly unnoticed. The track was later re-mixed and released in the U.S. on the minor disco label Beam Junction before Jones signed with Island Records and included it on her 1977 debut album Portfolio. "I Need a Man" then became a modest hit, reaching number 1 spot on the Billboard dance chart. It also contributed to Jones' growing popularity among gay scene.

The original mix of "I Need a Man", together with its B-side, "Again and Again", remain unreleased on CD.

Music video
The music video for the song was made using the chroma key technique and presents Grace wearing a white, knee-long plain dress, dancing to the track.

Track listings
7" single (1975)
A. "I Need a Man" – 3:15
B. "Again and Again" – 3:46

12" single (1977)
A. "I Need a Man" (disco mix) – 7:30
B. "I Need a Man" (instrumental version) – 4:53

UK 7" single (1977)
A. "I Need a Man" – 3:29
B. "I Need a Man" (Part 2) – 4:17

Chart performance

Cover versions
The American Hi-NRG group Man 2 Man recorded a cover version of "I Need a Man" in 1987. This version received play in many dance clubs and peaked at #43 on the UK Singles Chart.

References

1975 debut singles
Grace Jones songs
1975 songs